Joanne S. LaCourse (also written as Joanne La Course and published as Joanne Snare and Joanne S. Manning) is an American laser scientist associated with GTE. She earned her PhD in physics in 1977 from the University of North Carolina at Chapel Hill with the dissertation Superconducting Transition Temperatures and Residual Resistivities of Highly Disordered Lanthanum-Gold Films and was named a Fellow of the IEEE in 1995, "for contributions to the understanding of dynamic characteristics of semiconductor lasers". She was vice-president for membership of the IEEE Lasers and Electro-Optics Society in 1995.

References

External links
Joanne La Course, OSA Living History, The Optical Society

Year of birth missing (living people)
Living people
American physicists
American women physicists
Laser researchers
University of North Carolina at Chapel Hill alumni
Fellow Members of the IEEE
21st-century American women